Batavia Township may refer to the following places in the United States:

 Batavia Township, Boone County, Arkansas
 Batavia Township, Kane County, Illinois
 Batavia Township, Branch County, Michigan
 Batavia Township, Clermont County, Ohio

See also 
 Batavia (disambiguation)
 Batavia (town), New York

Township name disambiguation pages